Gretna is an unincorporated urban community in the Municipality of Rhineland within the Canadian province of Manitoba that held town status prior to January 1, 2015. Just north of the Canada - United States border on PTH 30, Gretna had a population of 541 in 2016.

It is bordered by Pembina County, North Dakota. The nearest American community to Gretna is Neche, North Dakota.

History 

Once home to roaming Buffalo herds, the area around Gretna attracted European settlers as far back as the early 19th century.  Originally, Gretna was only known as "Smuggler's Point", a simple border crossing where the flow of undeclared goods were smuggled over the border by early settlers and fur trappers. Soon after establishing the 49th parallel as the international border, Gretna became an important customs centre and border community for both the Canadian and American governments.

Gretna's strategic geographic location raised the interest of the Canadian Pacific Railway which encouraged the creation of large grain elevator operations in the area.  The Ogilvie Milling Company was one of the first and most prominent private companies in Gretna around the turn of the 20th century.  It is believed company founder William Ogilvie, originally from Scotland, named Gretna after Gretna Green in Scotland, also a border community, where runaway couples were married by the blacksmith at his anvil.

In 1889, Mennonite Collegiate Institute, a private high school, opened in Gretna.

In 1897, Gretna and area was visited by Russian prince and anarchist Peter Kropotkin who praised the local Mennonites for their industriousness and communal lifestyle.

Gretna soon became a prominent border community. As businesses thrived and expanded, Gretna life in the early 20th century was filled with promise and opportunity. As progress would have it, changes afforded Gretna no favours and the community began losing the grain milling industry responsible for its boom.  After World War II, Gretna became the centre for oil transfer to the United States of America. Enbridge Pipelines Inc. (the main storage and transfer company of oil in southern Manitoba) which has been, and continues to be, a supporting member of Gretna.

In 2013, the Provincial NDP Government legislated Manitoba communities under the population of 1000 must amalgamate with their nearest neighbouring municipality with a deadline of 2015.  Gretna lost its local government as a result and governmental control was passed to the RM of Rhineland, now the Municipality of Rhineland.

Gretna's history repeatedly reveals how this rural community has survived many changes and disasters.  It continues to draw young families looking for that comfortable mix between rural and urban; the comfort of small town living with the necessary amenities and close proximity to larger centres.

Demographics 

Notable people 
Rick Neufeld, musician
A. E. van Vogt, early 20th century sci-fi author, was born in Edenburg, a small village 2 miles east of Gretna.
Enoch Winkler, politician
Hal Winkler, former NHL player

See also 
 Neche–Gretna Border Crossing
 List of oil pipelines

References

External links 
Town of Gretna Online

Designated places in Manitoba
Former towns in Manitoba
Pembina Valley Region
Populated places disestablished in 2015
2015 disestablishments in Manitoba